Amblycheila picolominii is a species of nocturnal tiger beetle in the genus Amblycheila. Its common name is the plateau giant tiger beetle. It was discovered in 1839.

References

Cicindelidae
Beetles described in 1839